The following is a list of events affecting American television during 1993. Events listed include television series debuts, finales, cancellations, and channel initiations, closures and rebrandings, as well as information about controversies and disputes.

Events

Programs

Debuts

Returning this year

Ending this year

Entering syndication this year

Network changes

Made-for-TV movies and miniseries

Television stations

Station launches

Station closures

Births

Deaths

See also
 1993 in the United States
 List of American films of 1993

References

External links
List of 1993 American television series at IMDb

 
1990s in American television